High View is an unincorporated community in Hampshire County, West Virginia, United States. It is located south of Capon Bridge along West Virginia Route 259 on the Virginia line. High View is home to the Bhavana Society Forest Monastery and Retreat Center. According to the 2000 census, the High View community has a population of 791.

Historic sites 
 Timber Ridge Christian Church (1875), WV 259
 Timber Ridge Camping Reservation (1955), WV 259

References

External links
 The Bhavana Society Forest Monastery and Retreat Center
 Timber Ridge Camping Reservation

Timber Ridge Camping Reservation

Unincorporated communities in Hampshire County, West Virginia
Unincorporated communities in West Virginia